Drimys  may refer to:
 Drimys (fish), an extinct fish genus in the order Alepisauriformes
 Drimys (plant), a plant genus in the family Winteraceae